The BRICS Contingent Reserve Arrangement (CRA) is a framework for the provision of support through liquidity and precautionary instruments in response to actual or potential short-term balance of payments pressures. It was established in 2015 by the BRICS countries: Brazil, Russia, India, China and South Africa. The legal basis is formed by the Treaty for the Establishment of a BRICS Contingent Reserve Arrangement, signed at Fortaleza, Brazil on 15 July 2014. It entered into force upon ratification by all BRICS states, announced at the 7th BRICS summit in July 2015.

The objective of this reserve is to provide protection against global liquidity pressures. This includes currency issues where members' national currencies are being adversely affected by global financial pressures. The CRA is generally seen as a competitor to the International Monetary Fund (IMF) and along with the New Development Bank is viewed as an example of increasing South-South cooperation.

The capital of $100 billion is distributed as follows: The maximum access states can request from the Arrangement is half (China) to twice the amount of capital contributed.

The arrangement is scheduled to start lending in 2016.

See also
New Development Bank

References

External links
 Text of the Arrangement

BRICS
International finance institutions